College of Innovation, Thammasat University is a graduate school in Thammasat University, Thailand. The college was established on January 30, 1995, with a focus on interdisciplinary education, such as in the areas of technology management, cultural management, service innovation, innovative healthcare management, and IT policy and management.

External links
 Official website
 Facebook

Thammasat University
Business schools in Thailand
University departments in Thailand